The Vicar of Dibley is a British sitcom which originally ran on BBC One from 10 November 1994 to 1 January 2007. It is set in a fictional small Oxfordshire village called Dibley, which is assigned a female vicar following the 1993 changes in the Church of England that permitted the ordination of women. Dawn French plays the lead role, a vicar named Geraldine Granger.

In ratings terms, it is among the most successful British programmes in the digital era, the Christmas and New Year specials entering the UK top 10 programmes of the year.
The Vicar of Dibley received multiple British Comedy Awards, two International Emmys, and was a multiple British Academy Television Awards nominee. In 2004, it placed third in a BBC poll of Britain's Best Sitcoms.

In addition to the twenty main episodes between 1994 and 2007, the series includes numerous shorter charity specials, as well as 'lockdown' episodes produced during the COVID-19 pandemic.

Premise

Background
The series was created by Richard Curtis and written for actress Dawn French by Curtis and Paul Mayhew-Archer, with contributions from Kit Hesketh-Harvey. The main character was an invention of Richard Curtis, but he and Dawn French extensively consulted Joy Carroll, one of the first female Anglican priests, and garnered many character traits and much information.

Openings and epilogues
In earlier episodes, the opening credits were followed by a humorous village scene, such as a woman knitting directly from a sheep.

After the closing credits, Geraldine usually tells Alice a joke, to which Alice either overreacts, tries to interpret literally, or understands only after Geraldine explains it. There are a few exceptions to this in various episodes.

Cast and characters

Main cast

Recurring cast

Guest appearances
Hugh Bonneville, Mel Giedroyc, Richard Griffiths, Miranda Hart, Alistair McGowan, Geraldine McNulty, Philip Whitchurch, Nathalie Cox, Nicholas Le Prevost, Brian Perkins and Roger Sloman have all made one guest appearance each.

Pam Rhodes, Kylie Minogue, Rachel Hunter, Terry Wogan, Jeremy Paxman, Martyn Lewis, Darcey Bussell and Sean Bean each appeared as themselves in one episode.

Sarah, Duchess of York, Richard Ayoade, Orla Brady, Fiona Bruce, Annette Crosbie, Johnny Depp, Ruth Jones, Hilary Kay, Damian Lewis, Maureen Lipman, Jennifer Saunders, Sting and his wife Trudie Styler, Stephen Tompkinson, Dervla Kirwan, and Emma Watson have made guest appearances in short charity specials.

Episodes

The Vicar of Dibley has had 31 episodes as of 2022 including numerous short reprises with charity specials and the In Lockdown minis.

The first series was broadcast on BBC One from 10 November to 15 December 1994, consisting of six episodes. Following the first series, an Easter special and a Christmas special were broadcast in 1996. A four-episode second series was ordered and screened between the 26 December 1997 and 22 January 1998. Subsequent episodes consisted of Christmas and New Year specials, followed by a third series of four episodes, also referred to as seasonal specials as they have the titles Autumn, Winter, Spring and Summer airing from 24 December 1999 to 1 January 2000. Thereafter came the two-episode "A Very Dibley Christmas" screening between 25 December 2004 and 1 January 2005 and the two-part finale, "A Wholly Holy Happy Ending", which was broadcast during Christmas 2006 and New Year 2007.

The final 2006–2007 episodes, in which the character Geraldine finds love and marries, were publicised as the "last-ever" episodes, although there have been several reappearances of certain characters since.

On 15 March 2013, French reprised her role as Geraldine Granger as part of her French and Saunders marathon on BBC Radio 2. She was interviewed by Chris Evans on his Pause for Thought section. The following year, the Rev’d Ms. Granger led Thought for the Day on BBC Radio 4 (29 March 2014).

There have been eight short charity TV specials: six for Comic Relief between 1997 and 2015; and a seventh in April 2020, in which French appeared on The Big Night In as part of a joint Comic Relief and Children in Need special to support those affected by COVID-19. Due to the COVID-19 pandemic, the segment was filmed at French's home. For Comic Relief 2021, Geraldine appeared in the Dibley Vicarage, later lip-synching to Juice by Lizzo, with real-life celebrity priest the Rev’d Kate Bottley.

In December 2020, a series of short 'lockdown' episodes of The Vicar of Dibley were broadcast. The series consisted of three short episodes followed by a compilation episode of the previous three episodes' material shown back to back, but including previously unseen material and scenes. The style was completely different to the main series, with Geraldine and Hugo breaking the fourth wall via video messaging, talking directly to the viewers as if they were the Dibley congregation. The same method was used for the 2020 and 2021 Comic Relief shorts, also made and set during the Covid pandemic.

Production

Location and setting

The programme is set in the fictional Oxfordshire village of Dibley. Some of the villagers, including Alice, Jim, and Owen, speak with slight West Country accents, as were once common in Oxfordshire but are now less common. The series was filmed in the Buckinghamshire village of Turville near High Wycombe, with the village's St Mary the Virgin Church doubling as Dibley's St Barnabus. Other television programmes and films, such as Midsomer Murders, Goodnight Mister Tom, Chitty Chitty Bang Bang, Went the Day Well?, Father Came Too!, Marple, Lewis and Foyle's War have also been filmed in the village. The exterior location for David Horton's manor is in the village of Little Missenden, Buckinghamshire.

The opening titles show aerial shots of the M40 motorway's Stokenchurch Gap, the Chiltern Hills of Oxfordshire and Buckinghamshire, and the village of Turville.

Theme music
The theme music was a setting of Psalm 23 composed by Howard Goodall, and was performed by the choir of Christ Church Cathedral, Oxford, with George Humphreys singing the solo. The conductor was Stephen Darlington. Two versions are used over the opening credits: one with full choir, and one with a solo. Goodall originally wrote it as a serious piece of church choral music. It has been released as a charity single, with proceeds going to Comic Relief. It also appears on Goodall's CD Choral Works, which additionally includes his theme for Mr. Bean, another popular comedy co-created by Richard Curtis. A snippet of The Vicar of Dibley'''s theme music was used in the Mr. Bean episode "Tee Off, Mr. Bean” and the music from Mr Bean plays during Sean Bean’s scene in The Vicar of Dibley episode "Spring".

Awards and accolades

The series also won TV Choice Award for Best Comedy in 2005 and again in 2021 for the Lockdown Specials.

In May 2007, Richard Curtis received a BAFTA Academy Fellowship Award for his humanitarian pursuits, as well as his creative work, including The Vicar of Dibley.

Home mediaThe Vicar of Dibley was released in DVD in Region 2 (UK) from 2001. In 2002, a DVD entitled The Best of The Vicar of Dibley was released featuring a 90-minute film of Dawn French talking to the producer, Jon Plowman, with clips from the series. A 2002 documentary narrated by Jo Brand, entitled The Real Vicars of Dibley, was also on the DVD. In 2005, a boxset of the "complete collection" was released. This included all the then aired episodes. The final two episodes and 6-disc "ultimate" box set were released on 26 November 2007.

In Australasia (Region 4), all episodes have been released on DVD.

In the United States and Canada (Region 1), all episodes have been released on DVD.

Adaptations and possible return
On 6 February 2007, Fox announced plans to adapt The Vicar of Dibley into an American sitcom, titled The Minister of Divine. The series starred Kirstie Alley as a former "wild child" who returned to her hometown as its first female minister. The pilot was broadcast on Fox, but the series was not made.

The series has also been adapted into two stage plays by Ian Gower and Paul Carpenter, both incorporating plots from the TV episodes. The first is titled The Vicar of Dibley, and is largely concerned with Alice and Hugo's engagement and wedding. The second, A Vicar of Dibley Christmas – The Second Coming, is based on the episodes "Dibley Live" and "Winter", in which the villagers set up a radio station and put on a nativity play at Owen's farm.

In February 2016, it was reported that Dawn French was interested in returning to the role in a new series, The Bishop of Dibley, to follow on from the 2015 Red Nose Day Special. In December 2020, French opened up about the prospect of The Vicar of Dibley'' returning for a new series in 2021.

References

External links

 
1994 British television series debuts
2007 British television series endings
1990s British sitcoms
2000s British sitcoms
American television series based on British television series
BBC television sitcoms
British television series revived after cancellation
Comic Relief
English-language television shows
International Emmy Award for best comedy series winners
Religious comedy television series
Television series created by Richard Curtis
Television series by Banijay
Television series by Tiger Aspect Productions
Television series about Christian religious leaders
Television shows set in Oxfordshire